The Florida Film Critics Circle Award for Best Director is an award given by the Florida Film Critics Circle to honor the finest directing achievementes in filmmaking.

Winners
 † = Winner of the Academy Award for Best Director

1990s

2000s

2010s

2020s

References 

Florida Film Critics Circle Awards
Awards for best director